William Edgar Dunk (born 10 December 1938) is an Australian professional golfer.

Dunk was inducted as a life member of the Australasian Tour in 1996. Dunk won five Australian PGA Championships and the New Zealand Open. He won over 100 tournaments and broke over 80 course records, more than any other golfer in Australia, and in 1970 led the world's scoring averages from Jack Nicklaus with 70.21 for 110 rounds.

In 1970, Dunk set an Australian lowest-score record of 10 under par 60 at Merewether in the NBN-3 Tournament. His course records include 61 at Maitland, NSW, 63 at Hastings New Zealand, 64 at Victoria Golf Club ( 9 birdies, 9 pars), then the lowest score ever played in the Australian Open - 64 in the Texas Open, 65 at Royal Selangor, 66 at Royal Sydney and 66 at Kingston Heath. In 1971, at Coffs Harbour he surged to 11 under after only 12 holes. He finished with 63, nine under par on the card. In a span of 30 months between 1967 and 1969, he won 25 tournaments and set 25 course records. Dunk represented Australia in three World Cups and won the Malaysian Open and the New Zealand Open before settling on the NSW Central Coast.

Dunk is the son of a greenkeeper at Gosford Golf Club on the NSW Central Coast. He and his wife Annette have three children.

Professional wins (100+)

Japan Golf Tour wins (2)

PGA Tour of Australasia wins (9)

*Note: The 1978 Illawarra Open was shortened to 36 holes due to rain.

PGA Tour of Australasia playoff record (2–3)

Far East Circuit win (1)
1963 Malayan Open

Other wins
this list is incomplete
1960 New South Wales PGA
1962 Australian PGA Championship
1964 Metalcraft Tournament, Wiseman's Tournament, Wattie's Tournament (tie with Cobie Legrange), BP Tournament
1966 Australian PGA Championship, North Coast Open
1967 New South Wales Open, North Coast Open, Forbes $1.500 Purse
1968 New South Wales PGA, Spalding Masters
1969 New South Wales PGA, Brisbane Water Tournament
1970 New South Wales PGA, South Australian Open, North Coast Open, South Pacific Open
1971 Australian PGA Championship, New South Wales Open, North Coast Open, New South Wales PGA Foursomes Championship (with Graham Abbott)
1972 Queensland Open, Tasmanian Open, New Zealand Open, Caltex Tournament
1973 Queensland Open

Senior wins
this list is incomplete
1989 Australian PGA Seniors Championship, New South Wales Seniors
1990 New South Wales Seniors, Mitsukoshi Seniors (Japan)
1991 JAS Cup Senior (Japan), Misawa Resort Senior Open (Japan), Ho-Oh Cup (Japan)
1995 Australian PGA Seniors Championship
1993 Mizuno Senior Classic (Japan), HTB Hokkaido Senior (Japan)

Team appearances
World Cup (representing Australia): 1968, 1969, 1972

References

External links

Profile at Newcastle City Council Cultural site

Australian male golfers
PGA Tour of Australasia golfers
Sportsmen from New South Wales
People from Gosford
1938 births
Living people